was an independent Japanese video game developer funded by Capcom, Nintendo, and Sega located in Chūō-ku, Osaka Japan that was founded by game designer Yoshiki Okamoto. Flagship has often created scenarios for new and existing products, and has developed for Nintendo several times on the Game Boy Color and Game Boy Advance. Their last video game was Kirby: Squeak Squad for the Nintendo DS.

History
Flagship was founded by Yoshiki Okamoto on April 24, 1997. Funds and personnel for the startup were provided by Capcom, Sega, and Nintendo. The developer's first project was a series of episodic, Sega Saturn-exclusive RPGs, but it was never released.

In May 2007, Capcom announced Flagship would cease to exist from June 1, 2007, and their employees merged into Capcom's main studio. Quoting GameSpot's news on the dissolution of Flagship Studios "According to a Capcom spokesperson, while the Flagship name is getting the axe, its employees won't be. Noting that the only thing to change will be the company name on their business cards, the spokesperson said all Flagship staffers are expected to continue working at the publisher in the same capacities".

Games

Drama albums
BIO HAZARD DRAMA ALBUM ~Fate of Raccoon City~ Vol.1
BIO HAZARD DRAMA ALBUM ~Fate of Raccoon City~ Vol.2
BIO HAZARD DRAMA ALBUM ~Fate of Raccoon City~ Vol.3
BIOHAZARD 2 DRAMA ALBUM ~Sherry, the Little Runaway~
BIOHAZARD 2 DRAMA ALBUM ~Ada, the Female Spy, is Alive~

Novels
BIO HAZARD The Phantom Beast of the North Sea

References

Capcom
Video game development companies
Video game companies established in 1997
Video game companies disestablished in 2007
Defunct video game companies of Japan
Japanese companies established in 1997
Japanese companies disestablished in 2007